The 30th Flying Apsaras Awards were held in Hangzhou, Zhejiang, China. Nominees and winners are listed below, winners are in bold.

All Quiet in Peking won four awards, the most for the evening, including Outstanding Director, Outstanding Writer, Outstanding Actor and Outstanding Television Series Based on Significant Events. Other winners Romance of Our Parents won three awards, including Outstanding Director, Outstanding Actress and Outstanding Modern Television Series.

Winners and nominees

References

Flying Apsaras Awards
2015 television awards
2015 in China